The 1915–16 Harvard Crimson men's ice hockey season was the 19th season of play for the program.

Season
Before the season began, former members of the old  Intercollegiate Hockey Association (Cornell and Dartmouth) agreed to join the then current Intercollegiate Hockey League. Instead of playing a best-of-three series against all members, the new squads would only play their conference opponents once during the season.

Harvard began their title defense with a tune-up game against the Boston Athletic Association just before the winter break. After returning the Crimson faced Queen's and lost a close match to their Canadian opponents. The result of the game was secondary to the response from the crowd and an appeal to the Harvard faithful was made to show up in force to the remaining contests.

In their next game against Cornell the offense played rather poorly, with many scoring opportunities failing to the wayside. The team's defense, however, was in its typical stout form. Though the Big Red were hamstrung by a lack of practice, Harvard didn't give the Ithacans any chance and shut out Cornell for their first win of the season. The next game against a stronger Princeton squad and Harvard had to weather a barrage from the Tigers early in the game, but Wylde and the defense turned everything aside. In the second half Princeton got into penalty trouble, allowing the Crimson to score three times with the man-advantage and take the contest 3–0.

The rematch with Princeton one week later turned into a goaltending dual between Ford and Wylde. The two netminders kept their opponents scoreless through forty minutes of regulation and caused a pair of 5-minute overtimes to be used. Halfway through the first extra session Percy finally scored the first goal of the game to give Harvard the lead. Despite a furious pushback, Princeton was unable to solve Wylde and a further Crimson goal in the second overtime gave Harvard the series win over Princeton.

Harvard's three-game shutout streak was finally ended by McGill at the end of the month, but the Crimson were still able to win the match and head into the second half of their season with an excellent chance at winning a championship. In the match against Dartmouth, Harvard continued the season-long shutout against fellow universities and entered the series against Yale just two wins away from the intercollegiate championship. In the initial game Harvard used six substitutions and 13 saves from Wylde to tally its fifth shutout of the season.

Before the rematch with the Elis, Harvard earned a somewhat surprising victory over the St. Nicholas Hockey Club who were led by Hobey Baker. The team speed, particularly from Percy, and the overall defensive effort allowed Harvard to keep their opponents at bay for most of the game and respond when their foes did manage to score. The second game from Yale saw the Crimson receive a better fight that they had all year, with the Bulldogs scoring twice to end Harvard's pursuit of a perfect defensive campaign against intercollegiate competition. Yale scored first in each of the two half but Harvard responded both times with a pair of goals and Harvard skated to a series sweep against the Elis, a perfect record into intercollegiate matches and their second consecutive intercollegiate championship.

John Wylde's 5 shutouts on the season was a program record (tied) for 89 years while his 1.50 goals against average was one of the best results for a Crimson netminder.

Roster

Standings

Schedule and Results

|-
!colspan=12 style=";" | Regular Season

References

Harvard Crimson men's ice hockey seasons
Harvard
Harvard
Harvard
Harvard
Harvard